The 2022–23 St. Cloud State Huskies men's ice hockey season is the 88th season of play for the program. They will represent St. Cloud State University in the 2022–23 NCAA Division I men's ice hockey season and for the 10th season in the National Collegiate Hockey Conference (NCHC). The Huskies are coached by Brett Larson, in his fifth season, and play their home games at Herb Brooks National Hockey Center.

Season

Departures

Recruiting

Roster
As of August 23, 2022.

Standings

Schedule and results

|-
!colspan=12 style=";" | Regular Season

|-
!colspan=12 style=";" | 

|-
!colspan=12 style=";" |

Scoring statistics

Goaltending statistics

Rankings

USCHO did not release a poll in weeks 1 and 13.

References

2022-23
St. Cloud State Huskies
St. Cloud State Huskies
St. Cloud State Huskies
St. Cloud State Huskies